Hazem Salah Abu Ismail is an Egyptian lawyer, television preacher, and former presidential candidate. He was a host on The Fadfada Show which aired on Al-Nas Channel and is the founder of the Flag Party.

Presidential candidacy
Abu Ismail applied to be a candidate for the 2012 Egyptian presidential election. In early April 2012, he was considered one of the front-runners, and enjoyed notable displays of popular support.

In foreign policy, Abu Ismail is in favor of ending the 1979 Egypt–Israel peace treaty and has spoken of Iran as a successful model of independence from the United States. His domestic agenda includes veiling women and segregating them from men in the workplace.

On 4 April 2012, the New York Times reported that according to Californian government documents Abu Ismail's deceased mother held U.S. citizenship, which would make him ineligible for the presidency under the Egyptian constitution. He has denied this, stating that she only held a green card. On 5 April, the Ministry of Interior confirmed his mother's U.S. citizenship, prompting rallies by thousands of his supporters. In response to a case filed by Abu Ismail, the administrative court ruled against the Interior Ministry and ordered them to pay litigation expenses and to issue the would-be candidate with a document stating that his mother never held any other citizenship since they couldn't prove otherwise. The electoral commission, whose decisions are immune from judicial review, nonetheless disqualified him on 14 April.

Flag Party founder
Abu Ismail founded the Flag Party on 27 February 2013 and had reportedly been in talks to join a political alliance with the recently formed Homeland Party; however, he instead formed the Nation Alliance in early March 2013.

Aftermath of coup d'etat
In the aftermath of the 2013 Egyptian coup d'état, Abu Ismail was arrested on 5 July 2013. On 14 July Egypt's prosecutor general Hisham Barakat ordered Abu Ismail's assets to be frozen. Abu Ismail appeared in court on 18 November and stated: “If there is no real justice at the court hall, I will cede the defense.”

He was sentenced to 1 year imprisonment on 20 January 2014 and received a second sentence of 1 year imprisonment on 12 April for insulting the judiciary. He was sentenced to 7 years imprisonment on 16 April on charges of forging official documents during his application to run for president. He was sentenced to 5 years imprisonment on 29 January 2017 on charges of inciting the besieging of a Nasr City court in December 2012.

Egypt Watch, an independent advocacy and research platform, have described his trials and convictions as politically motivated.

References

1961 births
Living people
People from Giza Governorate	
Cairo University alumni
21st-century Egyptian politicians
Egyptian Salafis
Egyptian Islamists